The Franco–Turkish War, known as the Cilicia Campaign in France and as the Southern Front of the Turkish War of Independence in Turkey, was a series of conflicts fought between France (the French Colonial Forces and the French Armenian Legion) and the Turkish National Forces (led by the Turkish provisional government after 4 September 1920) from December 1918 to October 1921 in the aftermath of World War I. French interest in the region stemmed from the Sykes-Picot Agreement, and was further fueled by the refugee crisis following the Armenian genocide.

Background

Agreements

After the Armistice of Mudros, the French Army had moved into Çukurova in accordance with the secret Sykes-Picot Agreement of 1916, which gave France control of Ottoman Syria and southern Anatolia, including the key strategic locations of the fertile plain of Çukurova, the ports of Mersin and İskenderun (Alexandretta), and the copper mines in Ergani. On the other hand, the fertile lands of Mesopotamia and the vilayet of Mosul (where oil fields were suspected) were priorities for the British. According to the agreement, the British would look after the cities of Antep, Marash and Urfa until the French arrived in the southern Anatolian regions allocated to them in the agreement.

The French Armenian Legion under the command of General Edmund Allenby consisted of Armenian volunteers.

French occupation of Anatolia

Black Sea landings
After the armistice of Mudros, the first thing the French military did was to control the strategically important Ottoman coal mines in which French capital held significant stakes. The goal was both to take control of this energy source and to meet French military needs. It also prevented the distribution of coal in Anatolia, which could be used in activities to support insurgency.

On 18 March 1919, two French gunboats brought troops to the Black Sea ports of Zonguldak and Karadeniz Ereğli to command the Ottoman coal mining region. Because of the resistance they faced during their one-year stay in the region, French troops began to withdraw from Karadeniz Ereğli on 8 June 1920. They continued to pursue their occupation in Zonguldak, where they occupied the whole city on 18 June 1920.

Constantinople and Thrace operations
The main operations in Thrace aimed to support the strategic goals of the allies.
A French brigade entered Constantinople on 12 November 1918. On 8 February 1919, French general Franchet d'Espèrey—commander-in-chief of allied occupation forces in the Ottoman Empire—arrived in Constantinople to coordinate the occupation government.

The city of Bursa—a former Ottoman capital of central importance in northwest Anatolia—was also held by French forces for a brief period before the great summer offensive of the Greek army in 1920, at which time that city fell to the Greeks.

Cilicia Campaign

The first landing took place on 17 November 1918 at Mersin with roughly 15,000 men, mainly volunteers from the French Armenian Legion, accompanied by 150 French officers. The first goals of that expeditionary force were to occupy ports and dismantle the Ottoman administration. On 19 November, Tarsus was occupied in order to secure the surroundings and prepare for the establishment of headquarters in Adana.

After the occupation of Cilicia proper at the end of 1918, French troops occupied the Ottoman provinces of Antep, Marash and Urfa in southern Anatolia at the end of 1919, taking them over from British troops as agreed.

At the eastern tip of the occupation zone in the south, the city of Mardin was also occupied for one day (on 21 November 1919) until the evening, when the French thought it better to abandon the occupation attempt.

France designated Édouard Brémond governor of the French occupation zone in the south from January 1, 1919 – September 4, 1920, and Julien Dufieux from September 1920–23 December 1921.

In the regions they occupied, the French encountered immediate resistance from the Turkish, especially because they had associated themselves with Armenian objectives. The French soldiers were foreign to the region and were using Armenian militia to acquire their intelligence. Turkish nationals had been in cooperation with Arab tribes in this area. Compared to the Greek threat, the French seemed less dangerous to Mustafa Kemal Pasha, who suggested that, if the Greek threat could be overcome, the French would not hold its territories in Turkey, especially as they mainly wanted to settle in Syria.

The strategic goal of opening a southern front by moving Armenians against the Turkish National forces was a failure after the defeat of the Greek forces to the west.

On 11 February 1920, after 22 days of the Battle of Marash, the French occupation troops, followed by members of the local Armenian community, found themselves forced to evacuate Marash by the resistance and assaults of the Turkish revolutionaries. The loss of the city was accompanied by large-scale massacres of the Armenian population, with thousands of victims. French Armenian Legion member Sarkis Torossian suspects in his diary that the French forces gave weapons and ammunition to the Kemalists to allow the French army safe passage out of Cilicia.

Marash militia forces contributed further to the war effort by taking part in the recapture of other centers in the region, forcing the French forces to retreat gradually, town by town.

End of hostilities

The Cilicia Peace Treaty between France and the Turkish National Movement was signed on 9 March 1921. It was intended to end the Franco-Turkish war, but failed to do so and was replaced in October 1921 with the Treaty of Ankara signed by representatives of the French and the Turks on 20 October 1921, and finalized with Armistice of Mudanya.

Withdrawal and population movements

The French forces withdrew from the occupation zone in the first days of 1922, about ten months before the Armistice of Mudanya. Beginning on 3 January, French troops evacuated Mersin and Dörtyol. On 5 January they left Adana, Ceyhan and Tarsus. The evacuation was completed on 7 January with the last troops leaving Osmaniye.

In the early stages of the Greco-Turkish War, French and Greek troops jointly crossed the Meriç River and occupied the town of Uzunköprü in eastern Thrace and the railway route from there to the station of Hadımköy near Çatalca on the outskirts of Constantinople. In September 1922, at the end of that war, during the Greek pull-out after the advance of Turkish revolutionaries, French forces withdrew from their positions near the Dardanelles, but the British seemed prepared to hold their ground. The British government issued a request for military support from its colonies. This was refused, and the French leaving the British on the straits signaled that the Allies were unwilling to intervene in aid of Greece. Greek troops and the French withdrew beyond the Meriç River.

Aftermath

France had better relations with the Turkish nationals during the Turkish War of Independence, chiefly on account of breaking Triple Entente solidarity and signing a separate agreement with the Turkish National Movement. The Treaty of Ankara did not resolve the problems in connection with the sanjak of Alexandretta. However, positive Franco-Turkish relations were maintained. French policy supporting the Turkish independence movement were set back during the Conference of Lausanne on the abolition of the Capitulations of the Ottoman Empire. French objections during the discussions on abolition were perceived as contravening full Turkish independence and sovereignty. Furthermore, the fact that the sanjak of Alexandretta remained under French control also contributed to the tension between the two countries, as the Turks claimed the land in the Misak-ı Millî. The positive attitude developed with the Treaty of Ankara remained friendly, if limited.

The Ottoman debts were cleared by the Republic of Turkey in line with the Treaty of Lausanne.

See also
 Chronology of the Turkish War of Independence
 French campaign in Egypt and Syria
 Franco-Turkish relations

References

External links

 
Conflicts in 1918
Conflicts in 1919
Conflicts in 1920
Conflicts in 1921
1918 in France
1919 in France
1920 in France
1921 in France
1918 in the Ottoman Empire
1919 in the Ottoman Empire
1920 in the Ottoman Empire
1921 in the Ottoman Empire
Wars involving France
Wars involving Turkey